= Voyage on a Dinner Table =

- Genre: verse drama play
- Running time: 60 mins (4:10 pm – 5:15 pm)
- Country of origin: Australia
- Language: English
- Syndicates: ABC
- Written by: Shan Benson
- Directed by: Henry Cuthbertson
- Original release: 25 April 1954

Voyage on a Dinner Table is a 1954 Australian radio drama about Captain Cook by Shan Benson.

The play was much acclaimed and was repeated several times.

ABC Weekly said "the best scene was the clash between the forthright Captain Cook and the autocratic Sir Joseph Banks, and, as these two must have had many a verbal battle during their long voyage, one regretted that the author had not taken this for his theme instead of the somewhat nebulous conversation with the musician, Burney.. Mr. Benson writes well enough to make one hope that he will pursue his quarry further."

The play was published in an anthology Plays for Radio and Television, Nigel Samuel (editor) (London : Longman), 1959.

== Premise ==
"In the year 1772 Captain Cook is invited to dinner in London by the famous musician Dr. Burney. The contrast between the two men is marked: Burney the musician, “deep eyes dreaming”, slender white hands and lace at cuffs and throat; Cook, the sturdy seaman in the bright blue and gold braid of George the Third's' Royal Navy. Then Cook draws the route of his voyage to New South Wales in a book open on the table. We follow back his memory, hear the drama of that great journey, and wonder increasingly about the strange contradiction in its hero. Musician and seaman have more in common than might at first meet the eye... Shan Benson has written Voyage on a Dinner Table in a variety of verse forms, changing the rhythmic-approach as it skilfully paints in its pictures. The play asks the question: How was it that such a brilliant navigator and prober of the secrets of the South Seas as Captain James Cook could be so entirely matter-of-fact, work-a-day and almost unimaginative in his ordinary personality?"
